Remote Area Medical (RAM) is a non-profit provider of mobile medical clinics delivering free dental, vision, and medical care (as well as veterinary services when available) to under-served and uninsured individuals.

Founded by British philanthropist Stan Brock, it was originally conceived to treat people in the developing world, but turned its attention to those in need of health care in the United States.

History 
RAM was founded in 1985 by Stan Brock, who worked as an assistant to Marlin Perkins on Mutual of Omaha's Wild Kingdom. RAM's work was originally confined to developing countries, but it later shifted towards the US. Today RAM works domestic operations around the United States and internationally when need arises.

The clinic in Wise, Virginia, was recently recognized as the nation's largest pop-up free clinic. The 2017 clinic in Wise hosted over 1,000 volunteers and served 2,300 men and women.

RAM completed its 900th clinic in Knoxville, Tennessee, in 2018, and its 1,000th clinic in Knoxville, Tennessee in 2019.

RAM were featured on an episode of 60 Minutes on CBS.

Headquarters 
On March 31, 2014, Remote Area Medical's headquarters moved from an old school building in Knox County, Tennessee to the previous Henniges Automotive facility in Blount County, Tennessee. The previous school building was utilized by RAM for 19 years and was rented by the organization for $1 a year from Knox County.

Funding 
RAM is funded through donations and relies on volunteers from the community, as well as professionals including physicians, dentists, optometrists, nurses, pilots and veterinarians to provide care in poorer communities.

Animal services 
Remote Area Medical's Veterinary Program provides animal health services to those who live in underserved, impoverished, and isolated communities.

Disaster relief 
Remote Area Medical's Disaster Relief arm responds to disasters by land, sea, and air, delivering medical relief and other humanitarian aid when needed.

Legislation 
In 2017 Rep. John J. Duncan Jr., R-Knoxville, filed a bill that would provide $1 million to any state that allows licensed medical professionals to travel from other states and offer their services to those in need. The money would be a one-time allocation with the intent to help states pay any costs associated with allowing outside doctors to volunteer within their borders. The legislation, called the Healthier Act, specifies that out-of-state medical personnel could work only at weekend clinics. That would prevent them from moving into a state and setting up a permanent or semi-permanent practice.

References

External links
 

Health charities in the United States
International medical and health organizations
Medical and health organizations based in Tennessee